José Alejandro Rodríguez (born March 17, 1988) is a Mexican professional boxer.

Professional career
On August 28, 2010, Rodríguez beat the undefeated Jhean Carlo Aparicio at the Arena Coliseo in Guadalajara, Jalisco, Mexico.

In May 2011, José lost to title contender John Molina, Jr. and his shot at the vacant WBC USNBC lightweight title.

References

External links

Living people
1988 births
Mexican male boxers
Lightweight boxers
Boxers from Jalisco
Sportspeople from Guadalajara, Jalisco